Illaenus crassicauda is a species of trilobites belonging to the family Illaenidae. These trilobites lived in the middle Ordovician and in the Silurian age (443 - 418 million years ago). Fossils of this species have been found in the sediments of Sweden and Russia.

Etymology
The Latin species name crassicauda means "fat-tailed", with reference to the shape of the pygidium.

Description
These trilobites are without glabella and without articulation of the tail. The cephalon has a high profile. The large bulbous head are distant from the axis of the head, close to the margin.

References 

 V. Jaanusson  Zur Fauna und zur Korrelation der Kalksteine mit Illaenus crassicauda (sog. Flagkalk) im Siljan-Gebiet Dalarnas Geologiska Föreningen i Stockholm Förhandlingar - Volume 69, Issue 1, 1947

External links
 Fossil ID

Illaenina
Ordovician trilobites
Ordovician trilobites of Europe
Ordovician trilobites of Asia